Andrei Yuryevich Chasovskikh (born 31 May 1991) is a Russian former football forward.

Club career
He made his debut in the Russian Second Division for FC Tambov on 16 July 2013 in a game against FC Oryol.

He made his Russian Premier League debut for FC Tambov on 31 August 2019 in a game against FC Akhmat Grozny, as a 65th-minute substitute for Anton Kilin.

On 21 February 2020, Chasovskikh joined Aktobe on loan until the end of 2020.

References

External links
 
 

1991 births
Footballers from Tambov
Living people
Russian footballers
Association football forwards
FC Luch Vladivostok players
PFC Krylia Sovetov Samara players
FC Tambov players
Russian Premier League players
FC Aktobe players
Russian expatriate footballers
Expatriate footballers in Kazakhstan
Kazakhstan First Division players
FC Urozhay Krasnodar players
FC Vityaz Podolsk players